The Vanishing Westerner is a 1950 American Western film directed by Philip Ford, written by Robert Creighton Williams, and starring Monte Hale, Paul Hurst, Aline Towne, Roy Barcroft, Arthur Space and Richard Anderson. It was released on March 31, 1950, by Republic Pictures.

Plot

Cast
Monte Hale as Chris Adams
Paul Hurst as Waldorf Worthington
Aline Towne as Barbara
Roy Barcroft as "Sand" Sanderson
Arthur Space as Sheriff John Fast / Sir Cedric Fast
Richard Anderson as Deputy Sheriff Jeff Jackson
William Phipps as Bud Thurber
Don Haggerty as Henchman Art
Dick Curtis as Bartender
Rand Brooks as Sanderson's First Victim
Edmund Cobb as Mort
Harold Goodwin as Howard Glumm

References

External links 
 

1950 films
American Western (genre) films
1950 Western (genre) films
Republic Pictures films
Films directed by Philip Ford
Films adapted into comics
American black-and-white films
1950s English-language films
1950s American films